The Chertsey branch line connects Virginia Water station on the Waterloo to Reading main line to Weybridge station on the Waterloo to Woking main line. It is located in Surrey, England. Chertsey is an ancient market town and was first connected by a branch line from Weybridge in 1848. The line was continued to Virginia Water in 1866. Additional spurs were provided at each end of the line, forming triangular junctions. The southern junction to Byfleet proved useful for through trains from Windsor towards Woking and Portsmouth. The line was electrified in 1937.

At present (2023) the line is predominantly used for residential and shopping journeys, with a 30 minute train service frequency to London.

History

Surrounding railways
The London and Southampton Railway opened its main from Nine Elms station, London to Woking Common on 21 May 1838; there was a station at Weybridge. The company progressively extended the line to Southampton, and changed its name to the London and South Western Railway by Act of 4 June 1839.

The Richmond Railway was formed to build a line from Richmond to join the LSWR main line at what is now Clapham Junction. The line was opened on 27 July 1846 and acquired by the LSWR by an Act of 1846.

The Windsor, Staines and South Western Railway extended that route, from Richmond via Staines to Windsor, opening in 1849, and completing a through connection from London. It opened on 1 December 1849.

Weybridge to Chertsey

On 16 July 1846, the LSWR was authorised to construct a branch line from Weybridge to Egham, near Staines Bridge, but not crossing the River Thames. However the Windsor, Staines and South Western Railway had a second line of route authorised in its Act of 25 June 1847, to build a separate line from Staines via Chertsey to Pirbright. In authorising that line, Parliament cut back the LSWR Weybridge to Egham branch, so that it was authorised between Weybridge and Chertsey only.

As a result the short branch from Weybridge to Chertsey was built, and it opened for traffic on 14 February 1848.

Staines to Reading, at Virginia Water
In October 1852 local interests formed the Staines, Wokingham and Woking Railway; they obtained an authorising Act of Parliament on 8 July 1853. Their line was to run from the LSWR at Staines to reach Reading by connecting to the Reading, Guildford and Reigate Railway at Wokingham and using running powers. The Reading, Guildford and Reigate Railway was affiliated to the South Eastern Railway, and was later taken over by it. Also authorised was a branch line from Staines to Woking, but this was never built. The line was opened from Staines to Ascot on 4 June 1856, and on to Wokingham on 9 July 1856. The LSWR worked the line under temporary agreements at first but from 25 March 1858 a 42-year lease was concluded, and the LSWR later acquired the company outright.

Chertsey to Virginia Water

It was a double-track line; the Chertsey station was replaced by a new one on the north-west side of Guildford Road. The former station was developed into a larger goods yard.

At the Virginia Water end of the route there was a spur facing Ascot, enabling direct running from Chertsey towards Reading. It was opened as a single line on the same day as the main route, and it was doubled in December 1898.

Byfleet Junction

The connection from the Windsor lines to the main line was considered to be useful, especially as Queen Victoria was making journeys from Windsor to the Isle of Wight. A west-to-south curve was made at Staines, enabling direct running from Windsor towards Virginia Water; this was opened on 1 July 1884. Powers were obtained on 20 August 1883 to make a 68chain (1.4km) curve from a junction near Addlestone into the main line towards Woking, forming a triangular junction with the original Weybridge connection. It ran from Addlestone Junction to Byfleet Junction. The curve opened on 10 August 1885, so that direct running from Windsor to Woking and beyond was now possible, but it was not used regularly until 4 July 1887. From 1 May 1889 a public passenger service between Windsor and Woking was operated.

At this time the main line was double track and the junction was conventional, but completion of the quadrupling of the main line was being undertaken in the first years of the twentieth century. The opportunity was taken to make the down Chertsey connection a burrowing line under the main line. This was commissioned on 19 February 1903.

The Windsor to Woking passenger service was withdrawn on 30 January 1916 as part of the LSWR's wartime economy measures, and from that time there were only a few advertised workings over the Addlestone Junction to Byfleet Junction line, and none at all after July 1921.

A service over the route was resumed in May 1986 when trains operated from Staines to Woking via Chertsey. Later this was extended to run as a service from Waterloo via Hounslow to Guildford. It was not well used and in 1992 it was withdrawn with a single daily token train continuing to run.

Slip coaches
In 1863 a slip coach connection to Chertsey was started. A slip coach was detached from a down main line train prior to reaching Weybridge. After the coach came to a stand at Weybridge station, a locomotive took it forward to Chertsey. The service lasted from June 1863 until June 1902.

Electrification

In 1935 the Southern Railway, successor to the LSWR, decided to electrify the Portsmouth Direct line and associated branches. This was referred to as the Portsmouth No 1 Electrification, and it was carried out with Government financial assistance under the Railways (Agreeement) Act. The line between Weybridge and Staines was included, and the scope included the Byfleet West Curve. The electrification system was at 660 VDC third rail. Full electric services started between Weybridge and Virginia Water on 3 January 1937.

The enhanced electrification timetable resulted in heavy congestion at Woking, and the Alton trains ran as independent shuttles to avoid platform occupation at Woking while uncoupling, and actually ran to and from Chertsey empty to reverse. Electrification onwards from Virginia Water to Reading was in use from 1 January 1939, and on that date the Virginia Water West Curve was electrified, although no timetabled passenger service used it.

M25 underbridge

Between Virginia Water and Chertsey, the line crosses the M25 motorway by means of a cable-stayed bridge, the first such heavy rail underbridge in Europe. The bridge has two spans of  each. The bridge was designed by the Southern Region of British Railways. Contract value for the construction was £1.04 million. The particular configuration was chosen to minimise disruption to the operational railway, and to save about £500,000 compared to a conventional design. It was completed in 1979.

Closure of Viriginia Water West Curve
Virginia Water West Curve was closed on 27 July 1964.

Stations
 Virginia Water; Staines, Wokingham and Woking Railway station; opened 9 July 1856; still open;
 Chertsey; opened 14 February 1848; resited 1 October 1866; still open;
 Addlestone; opened 14 February 1848; still open;
 Weybridge; originally London and Southampton Railway station; opened 21 May 1838; still open.

Passenger train services
In January 2023, on Mondays to Saturdays, a half-hourly all-stations service from Weybridge to Waterloo runs via Staines and the Hounslow Loop Line. On Sundays there is an hourly all-stations service from Woking to Waterloo via Chertsey and Hounslow, using the west curve at Byfleet Junction.

References

Railway lines in South East England
Rail transport in Surrey